The UAE International Award for Poets of Peace was launched on 1 May 2014 for poets at the International Humanitarian City (IHC) in Dubai, United Arab Emirates. It is claimed to be the first award of its kind, bridging a multitude of nationalities and languages in which poets will present their sonnets, spreading a message of peace around the world.

The global award plan at using poetry to disseminate consciousness amongst people about the importance of peace and raises further awareness for humanitarian work around the world.

The award is launched in collaboration with the United Nations World Food Programme.

Objectives
The Award has the following objectives:
 Promote the peace message to the world
 Spread the culture of peace across the world
 Raise awareness for humanitarian work around the world
 Support world relief programs.

Vision
The Award has the following vision:
 Sending a message to the world about the need to stop war and combat hunger
 Unifying world peace in one entity bound by peace, without discrimination on race or religion, & spreading the message of love, unity and peace.

References

External links
Msader-ye.net
Gulftoday.ae
Zawya.com
Ihc.ae
Uaeinteract.com
أطلاق جائزة الامارات العالمية لشعراء السلام - المؤتمر الصحفي الاول
نقل حصري لجائزة الامارات العالمية لشعراء السلام على قناة دبي في برنامج مدارات

2014 establishments in the United Arab Emirates
Awards established in 2014
Events in Dubai
Poetry awards
Peace awards
International literary awards
Emirati literary awards